Thomas Meredith was an Anglo-Irish clergyman.

Thomas Meredith or Thomas Meredyth may also refer to:
Sir Thomas Meredyth (died 1677), MP for Old Leighlin (Parliament of Ireland constituency)
Thomas Meredith (MP for Kent) (after 1666–1701), English Whig politician
Thomas Meredyth or Meredith (died 1719), British Army officer and MP
Thomas Meredyth (died 1732), Irish MP
Thomas Meredith (Baptist leader) (1795–1850), U.S. Baptist leader
Thomas Graves Meredith (1853–1945), Canadian lawyer and businessman
Thomas Meredith (priest), Archdeacon of Singapore, 1892–1890